"Icehouse" is a song by the Australian rock band Flowers, later known as Icehouse. It was released as a single in Europe in 1982 by Chrysalis Records from the band's first album, Icehouse, after the band changed its name to Icehouse. In the United States, the song peaked at number 28 on the Billboard Top Tracks chart in 1981.

"Icehouse" was written by founding member Iva Davies when he lived at 18 Tryon Road, Lindfield in an old, cold flat of a two-storey mansion—across the street was a dishevelled house which had its lights on all night peopled by short-term residents. Davies only learned that it was a half-way house for psychiatric and drug rehab patients after he wrote the song. Russell Mulcahy, an expatriate Australian living in London, directed the music video for "Icehouse". A remix version by Pee Wee Ferris & John Ferris was released on the Icehouse album Meltdown in 2002.

Track listing
All tracks written by Iva Davies except where noted.

7" single (UK release)
 "Icehouse" - 4:23
 "All the Way" (live) - 4:06

12" single (UK release)
 "Icehouse" - 4:23
 "All the Way" (live) - 4:06
 "Cold Turkey" (live)(written by John Lennon) - 4:11

Personnel
Producer — Cameron Allan, Iva Davies

References

1982 singles
Icehouse (band) songs
Music videos directed by Russell Mulcahy
Songs written by Iva Davies
1980 songs
Chrysalis Records singles